Kim Bukhantsov (born 25 November 1931) is a Soviet former athlete. He competed in the men's discus throw at the 1956, 1960 and the 1964 Summer Olympics. He coached Faina Melnik and Ehsan Hadadi.

References

External links
 

1931 births
Living people
Athletes (track and field) at the 1956 Summer Olympics
Athletes (track and field) at the 1960 Summer Olympics
Athletes (track and field) at the 1964 Summer Olympics
Soviet male discus throwers
Olympic athletes of the Soviet Union
Place of birth missing (living people)